Ahmed Hussein (1905–1982) was an Egyptian lawyer and politician who founded a nationalist party, Young Egypt, in the 1930s.

Early life and education
Hussein was born in 1905. He received religious education and a degree in law.

Career and political activities
Hussein started a magazine entitled Al Sarkha (Arabic: Scream) in which he published a program of his political group, "Society of the Free Youth, Supporters of the Treaty", which had been established on 20 August 1929. It was consisted of the nationalist Egyptian figures led by his friend Fathi Radwan. The group was reestablished as a political party under the name Young Egypt which was started on 21 October 1933. In his writings in Al Sarkha Hussein harshly criticized Western democracy and praised Fascism and Nazism supporting the implementation of these ideologies in addition to Sharia rule in Egypt. He sent a letter to Adolf Hitler and asked him to convert to Islam.

Hussein was arrested in July 1941 due to his extreme nationalist activities. He escaped while he was treated at a hospital, but in November 1942 he surrendered himself to the police. In 1944 he was released from prison. In July 1946 he was again arrested with other Young Egypt party members following the headline of the party newspaper, Al Ishtrakia, as "Revolt, Revolt, Revolt!". They were freed on bail soon. 

Hussein renamed his party as Egyptian Social Democratic Party in the late 1940s and later it was renamed as the National Islamic Party. In the 1950s his brother and a member of Young Egypt, Adil Hussein, joined a communist party, namely Haditu.

Later life and death
Hussein had a stroke in 1969 and retired from public life. He died on 27 September 1982 after he had been hospitalized because of heart problems.

References

External links

20th-century Egyptian lawyers
20th-century Egyptian politicians
1905 births
1982 deaths
Egyptian nationalists
Egyptian magazine founders
Egyptian political party founders
Egyptian Islamists
Egyptian prisoners and detainees